Lake Vereteno is a narrow glacial lake,  long, located in the northeast part of Breidnes Peninsula, Vestfold Hills in Princess Elizabeth Land of Antarctica.

The lake was first photographed by U.S. Navy Operation Highjump (1946–47), and subsequently by ANARE (Australian National Antarctic Research Expeditions) (1954–58), and the Soviet Antarctic Expedition (1956). It was named Ozero Veretenu (Spindle Lake) by the latter.

Lakes of Princess Elizabeth Land
Ingrid Christensen Coast